Dalla polycrates is a species of butterfly in the family Hesperiidae. It is found in Peru, Colombia and Ecuador.

Subspecies
Dalla polycrates polycrates - Colombia
Dalla polycrates ambala Evans, 1955 - Ecuador
Dalla polycrates lania Evans, 1955 - Peru

References

Butterflies described in 1867
polycrates
Hesperiidae of South America
Taxa named by Baron Cajetan von Felder
Taxa named by Rudolf Felder